Michael Sheen, (born 5 February 1969), is a Welsh stage and screen actor. After training at the Royal Academy of Dramatic Art, Sheen made his professional debut in 1991, starring opposite Vanessa Redgrave in When She Danced at the Globe Theatre. He worked mainly in theatre throughout the 1990s and made notable stage appearances in Romeo and Juliet (1992), Don't Fool With Love (1993), Peer Gynt (1994), The Seagull (1995), The Homecoming (1997) and Henry V (1997). His performances in Amadeus at the Old Vic and Look Back in Anger at the National Theatre were nominated for Olivier Awards in 1998 and 1999, respectively.

In the 2000s, while continuing to make sporadic stage appearances, Sheen became known primarily as a screen actor. In 2003, he starred in the film Underworld as Lucian the leader of the Lycans, a role he had once again in 2006's Underworld: Evolution via archive footage. Also in 2003, he was nominated for a third Olivier Award for his performance in Caligula at the Donmar Warehouse and had a breakthrough performance as the British politician Tony Blair in the television film The Deal. He received a BAFTA Award nomination in 2004 for his work in the ITV drama Dirty Filthy Love. In 2006, Sheen starred as the troubled comic actor Kenneth Williams in BBC Four's Fantabulosa! and came to the attention of an international audience when he reprised his role as Blair in The Queen. Both performances were BAFTA Award-nominated. Sheen received a fourth Olivier Award nomination in 2006 for portraying the broadcaster David Frost in Frost/Nixon at the Donmar Warehouse and he later revisited the role of Frost in the 2008 film adaptation of the play. In 2009, Sheen appeared in two fantasy films, Underworld: Rise of the Lycans and The Twilight Saga: New Moon, and starred as the outspoken football manager Brian Clough in The Damned United.

In the 2010s, Sheen has divided his time between film, television and theatre work. In 2010, he made a four-episode guest appearance in the NBC comedy 30 Rock and was nominated for an Emmy Award for his portrayal of Blair in the HBO film The Special Relationship. He appeared in the science-fiction film Tron: Legacy (2010) and Woody Allen's romantic comedy Midnight in Paris (2011). At Easter 2011, Sheen directed and starred in National Theatre Wales's The Passion, a 72-hour secular passion play staged in his hometown of Port Talbot. From October 2011 until January 2012, Sheen played the title role in Hamlet at the Young Vic.

Sheen has also appeared in many radio productions, particularly in the early years of his career. Notable radio play appearances include Strangers on a Train (1994) opposite Bill Nighy, The Importance of Being Earnest (1995) opposite Judi Dench,  Romeo and Juliet (1997) opposite Kate Beckinsale, Troy (1998) opposite Paul Scofield and The Pretenders (2004) opposite, again, Paul Scofield. He has also narrated five novels and presented a series of documentaries for BBC Radio 2 and BBC Radio 4.

Theatre

Film

Television

Radio and audiobooks

Sheen has appeared in many other productions for BBC Radio 4 and BBC World Service including The Blind Men, The Left Over Heart (Johnny), Sailing with Homer, The Life of Christ and Wiglaf. However, the broadcast dates of these productions are unknown.

References

External links

Male actor filmographies
British filmographies